() was a Scottish Gaelic-language religious newspaper published in the mid-1920s in Sydney, Nova Scotia, on Cape Breton Island.

When  launched in 1925, it intended to publish monthly, but after a few months the paper's publication became less frequent. The final issue was published in 1927. Each issue was just eight-pages long and included no advertising, but was apparently supported by the United Church of Canada. It provided significant coverage of church-related news, including ministerial appointments and church meetings. Details of its ownership and editor were not made clear in the paper; the March 1925 issue indicated it was published by authority of the Church Union Council of the Presbyterian Church in Canada, but later issues lacked any such notice.

References

External link
  archives via Nova Scotia Archives

1925 establishments in Nova Scotia
1925 disestablishments in Nova Scotia
Publications established in 1925
Publications disestablished in 1927
Defunct newspapers published in Nova Scotia
Newspapers with Scottish Gaelic content